Dumitru Daniel Benzar (born 30 December 1997) is a Romanian professional footballer who plays mainly as a right winger for Liga II side SSU Politehnica Timișoara.

Club career

FCSB
Daniel Benzar played his first official game in Liga I in 2017, in a 1–1 draw against Universitatea Craiova, coming on as a substitute for Harlem Gnohéré in the 70th minute. He scored his first goal for Steaua on 6 August 2017 in a 2–1 away win over Concordia Chiajna.

Personal life
Daniel Benzar is the younger brother of Lecce defender Romario Benzar.

References

External links

1997 births
Living people
Sportspeople from Timișoara
Romanian footballers
Association football midfielders
Liga I players
FC Steaua București players
FC Steaua II București players
FC Voluntari players
FC Dunărea Călărași players
Liga II players
LPS HD Clinceni players
FC Rapid București players
SSU Politehnica Timișoara players